The Texaco Trophy was the name used for One Day International cricket tournaments held in England from 1984 until 1998.

The series were sponsored by American oil company Texaco replacing the previous sponsorship by the UK's Prudential (between 1972 and 1982). Depending on the number of teams touring England in a given season, there would typically be either one or two series each year, involving the home side and each visiting side. The series usually consisted of three matches, but varied in length between one and five matches.

Series by year

Notable matches
In a 1984 match at Old Trafford between England and the West Indies, Vivian Richards scored 189 not out, then the world-record score for a limited-overs international match.

In the second match of the 1993 series against Australia, Robin Smith scored 167 not out, which remained the record score by any England batsman in One Day Internationals until August 2016 when Alex Hales scored 171 against Pakistan at Trent Bridge. England, however, went on to lose the match.

The second match of the 1989 series at Trent Bridge, Nottingham was a tie with both England and Australia scoring 226 from 55 overs. With the other two matches in the 3-match series split 1-1, England were awarded the series by virtue of having lost fewer wickets in the tied match (they also had a superior overall run-rate.)

Replacement series
 Emirates Triangular (1998)
NatWest Series (2000–present)

References

One Day International cricket competitions
Texaco
International cricket competitions in England